Princess Louise de Merode  (née Leakey, born 21 March 1972) is a Kenyan paleontologist and anthropologist. She conducts research and field work on human fossils in Eastern Africa.

Early life and education
Louise Leakey was born in Nairobi, Kenya, to Kenyan paleoanthropologist, conservationist and politician Richard Leakey and British paleoanthropologist Meave Leakey in 1972, the same year that her paleoanthropologist grandfather, Louis Leakey, died. She first became actively involved in fossil discoveries in 1977, when at the age of five she became the youngest documented person to find a hominoid fossil.

Leakey earned her International Baccalaureate from United World College of the Atlantic and a Bachelor of Science degree in geology and biology from the University of Bristol. She earned a PhD from the University College, London in 2001.

Career
In 1993, Leakey joined her mother as a co-leader of paleontological expeditions in northern Kenya. The Koobi Fora research project has been the main program behind some of the most notable hominid fossil discoveries of the past two decades, the most recent being Kenyanthropus platyops.

Leakey has promoted an initiative to place digital models of fossil collections in a virtual laboratory, African Fossils, where models can be downloaded, 3D printed or cut in cardboard for reassembly.

Personal life
In 2003, Leakey married Prince Emmanuel de Merode, a Belgian primatologist. She is styled princesse de Merode by marriage. The couple have two daughters:
 Princess Seiyia de Merode; born in 2004
 Princess Alexia de Merode; born in 2006.

See also
 List of fossil sites (with link directory)
 List of hominina (hominid) fossils (with images)

References

External links
 Leakey Foundation
 African Fossils
 Koobi Fora Research Project
 
  "A dig for humanity's origins" (TED2008)

1972 births
Living people
Alumni of the University of Bristol
Alumni of the University of London
Kenyan archaeologists
Kenyan paleontologists
Kenyan people of British descent
Kenyan people of English descent
Kenyan scientists
Louise
Louise
Paleoanthropologists
People educated at Atlantic College
White Kenyan people
Women paleontologists